Million Dollar Mystery is a 1927 silent film mystery starring real-life married couple, James Kirkwood and Lila Lee. It was directed by Charles J. Hunt and produced by an independent film company. It survives today in a foreign archive.

Cast
James Kirkwood as James Norton
Lila Lee as Florence Grey
Henry Sedley as Leo Braine
Erin La Bissoniere as Olga Perigoff
Elmer Dewey as Boris Orloff
Edward Gordon as Alec Felton
John Elliott as Stanley Hargreaves/Inspector Jedson

References

External links
Million Dollar Mystery at IMDb.com

1927 films
American silent feature films
1927 mystery films
American mystery films
American black-and-white films
Rayart Pictures films
1920s English-language films
Films directed by Charles J. Hunt
1920s American films
Silent mystery films